This is a list of wetlands in Australia that are designated by the Ramsar Convention as sites of international importance. Under the convention, the wetlands are considered as being of significant value not only for the Australian community, but for humanity as a whole.

Management of Ramsar wetlands in the Australian jurisdiction
The management of Ramsar sites listed within Australia is controlled at national level by the Australian government via the Environment Protection and Biodiversity Conservation Act 1999 and its accompanying regulations, the Environment Protection and Biodiversity Conservation Regulations 2000.

The act, as of 2015, lists the principles required for meeting treaty obligations in respect to "wetlands of international importance" including "environmental approvals" (i.e. sections 16-17B), the prerequisites for the making of both "declarations" and "bilateral agreements" (i.e. sections 34C and 37F, and 52 respectively), the approval process (i.e. section 138), "strategic assessments" (i.e. section 134J), and the management approach (i.e. sections 325 to 336 inclusive).

The applicable regulation (i.e. regulation 10.02) lists three requirements as of 2015. Firstly, a set of general principles for management is described including the need for "public consultation," the involvement of parties with an interest and/or who may be affected by the management of wetland, as well as allowing for "continuing community and technical input." Secondly, the requirements for the management plan to be prepared for each listed wetland are described. Thirdly, the requirements for the "environmental impact assessment and approval" are described for parties wishing to undertake activities that are likely to have "a significant impact on the ecological character of a Ramsar wetland."

Australian Capital Territory
The following wetlands are located in the Australian Capital Territory:

New South Wales
The following wetlands are located in New South Wales:

Northern Territory
The following wetlands are located in the Northern Territory:

Queensland
The following wetlands are located in Queensland:

South Australia
The following wetlands are located in South Australia:

Tasmania
The following wetlands are located in Tasmania:

Victoria
The following wetlands are located in Victoria:

Western Australia
The following wetlands are located in Western Australia:

External territories
The following wetlands are located in the External territories:

See also

 List of Ramsar sites worldwide
A Directory of Important Wetlands in Australia

References

External links
Official Australian Government webpage
 List of Ramsar Sites
 Australia's National Report to the 11th Conference of the Parties, 2011

Wetlands of Australia
 
Ramsar sites
Australia
Ramsar sites